The 1960 Washington State Cougars football team was an American football team that represented Washington State University as an independent during the 1960 NCAA University Division football season. In their fifth season under head coach Jim Sutherland, the Cougars compiled a 4–5–1 record and outscored their opponents 210 to 161.

The team's statistical leaders included Mel Melin with 1,638 passing yards, Keith Lincoln with 543 rushing yards, and Hugh Campbell with 881 receiving yards.

Schedule

NFL Draft
One Cougar was selected in the 1961 NFL Draft, which was twenty rounds (280 selections).

References

External links
 Game program: Stanford vs. WSU at Spokane – September 17, 1960
 Game program: Pacific at WSU – October 22, 1960
 Game program: Oregon State at WSU – November 5, 1960
 Game program: Washington vs. WSU at Spokane – November 19, 1960

Washington State
Washington State Cougars football seasons
Washington State Cougars football